Mundelein is a village in Lake County, Illinois, United States and a northern suburb of Chicago. Per the 2020 census, the population was 31,560. It is approximately thirty-five miles northwest of Chicago.

History

The community now known as Mundelein has been inhabited since at least 1650, when the Potawatomi people were known to have been trading with French fur traders. The first European inhabitants reached the area in the early 19th century. Peter Shaddle (for whom a street is named) was the first known settler, building a log cabin in the area now owned by St. Mary of the Lake Seminary in 1835.

The next settlers were tradesmen escaping from England's industrial depression, who became farmers in the Mundelein area. In honor of their former professions, they named the city "Mechanics Grove", and built schools, churches, and businesses. The community grew and (while still unincorporated) changed its name to "Holcomb", in honor of John Holcomb, a person who was active in the area's development. As Holcomb, the community added a railway station and a post office. The Holcomb area incorporated in February 1909 under a new name, "Rockefeller", a reference to businessman, John D. Rockefeller.

The name Rockefeller was short-lived, however. In July 1909, the community became "Area". This name change was requested by a local educational entrepreneur named Arthur Sheldon, who bought  near town and built a school on it. The school taught sales techniques, including the philosophy of "AREA", which stood for "Ability, Reliability, Endurance, and Action." At one time, it boasted 10,000 students, many of them women (which was unusual for 1909).

In 1915, Archbishop George Mundelein (later Cardinal) of Chicago purchased the property from Sheldon after the Area campus closed to re-establish the Archdiocese's University of Saint Mary of the Lake, also known as the Mundelein Seminary, which continues to exist today.

On December 10, 1924, the Village Board held a special meeting with representatives from the Soo Line Railroad, who requested that the board change the village's name to Mundelein (for the cardinal). The board voted to make the change and asked the Illinois Secretary of State to make the name change. They received permission in April 1925, and the Village Board passed an ordinance changing the village's name to Mundelein. Cardinal Mundelein donated the village its first new fire truck, a 1925 Stoughton. The fire truck was officially turned over to the village at a ceremony held at the St. Mary of the Lake Seminary on July 17, 1925. The original Village Hall, built in 1929 with a few additions over the years, was used until June 2014.

In the 1970s the community was largely residential with a little light industrial development.

Geography
Mundelein is located at 42°15'47.0"N 88°00'14.4"W (42.263049, -88.004010).

Demographics

2020 census

2010 Census
As of the 2010 US Census, there were 31,064 people living in the village. The racial makeup of the village was 72.29% White, 1.52% African American, 0.65% Native American, 8.77% Asian, 0.03% Pacific Islander, 14.18% from other races, and 2.56% from two or more races. Hispanic or Latino of any race were 30.08% of the population.

2000 Census
As of the 2000 census, there were 30,935 people, 9,858 households, and 7,718 families living in the village. The racial makeup of the village was 78.68% White, 1.60% Black, 0.28% Native American, 6.60% Asian, 0.07% Pacific Islander, 10.66% from other races, and 2.11% from two or more races. Hispanic or Latino of any race were 24.20% of the population.

There were 9,858 households, out of which 47.2% had children under the age of 18 living with them, 65.0% were married couples living together, 9.0% had a female householder with no husband present, and 21.7% were non-families. 17.0% of all households were made up of individuals, and 4.5% had someone living alone who was 65 years of age or older. The average household size was 3.12 and the average family size was 3.52.

In the village, the population was spread out, with 31.4% under the age of 18, 8.3% from 18 to 24, 36.0% from 25 to 44, 18.1% from 45 to 64, and 6.2% who were 65 years of age or older. The median age was 32 years. For every 100 females, there were 104.6 males. For every 100 females age 18 and over, there were 103.6 males.

Income
The median income for a household in the village was $69,651, and the median income for a family was $75,083. By 2017, median incomes were estimated at $86,336 per household and $96,813 per family. Males had a median income of $50,290 versus $34,087 for females. The per capita income for the village was $26,280. About 3.0% of families and 4.6% of the population were below the poverty line, including 5.2% of those under age 18 and 3.4% of those age 65 or over.

Economy

Top employers
According to Mundelein's 2019 Comprehensive Annual Financial Report, the top employers in the village are:

{| class="wikitable"
!colspan="5"|2019
|-
! #
! Employer
! Type of Business
! # of Employees
! % Village Pop.
|-
| style="text-align:right;" | 1
| Medline Industries
| Hospital supplies
| style="text-align:center;" | 900
| style="text-align:center;" | 2.90%
|-
| style="text-align:right;" | 2
| Accurate Transmissions
| Remanufactured transmissions
| style="text-align:center;" | 320
| style="text-align:center;" | 1.03%
|-
| style="text-align:right;" | 3
| Amcor Flexibles Healthcare, Inc.
| Flexible polyethylene packaging
| style="text-align:center;" | 350
| style="text-align:center;" | 1.13%
|-
| style="text-align:right;" | 4
| Maclean-Fogg Co.
| Industrial fasteners (plants and offices)
| style="text-align:center;" | 240
| style="text-align:center;" | 0.77%
|-
| style="text-align:right;" | 5
| University of Saint Mary of the Lake
| Seminary / School for the priesthood
| style="text-align:center;" | 220
| style="text-align:center;" | 0.71%
|-
| style="text-align:right;" | 6
| Mundelein Elementary School #75
|Public elementary school
| style="text-align:center;" | 220
| style="text-align:center;" | 0.71%
|-
| style="text-align:right;" | 7
| Mundelein High School #120
| Public high school
| style="text-align:center;" | 210
| style="text-align:center;" | 0.68%
|-
| style="text-align:right;" | 8
| Ruprecht Company
| Meat processing
| style="text-align:center;" | 250
| style="text-align:center;" | 0.80%
|-
| style="text-align:right;" | 9
| Village of Mundelein
| Village government
| style="text-align:center;" | 185
| style="text-align:center;" | 0.60%
|-
| style="text-align:right;" | 10
| Carter Hoffman Co.
| Food service equipment
| style="text-align:center;" | 110
| style="text-align:center;" | 0.35%
|-
| colspan="3" style="text-align:right;" | Total
| style="text-align:center;" | 3,005
|
|}

Neighborhoods 

 Grand Dominion (Active Adult)
 Barnhill
 Diamond Lake
 Fields of Ambria
 Loch Lomond
 Sylvan Lake
 West Shore Park
 Countryside
 Cambridge Countryside
 Fairhaven
 Tullamore
 Ambria
 Cambridge Country
 Holcomb
 Cambridge Country North
 Hampton Reserve
 Long Meadow
 Woodhaven
 Colony Of Long Meadow
 Steeple Chase
 Orchard Meadows
 Lakewood Village
 Cambridge West

School districts
Four public school districts serve Mundelein residents:

Hawthorn School District 73:

Mundelein Elementary School District 75:
 Washington School - Grade Center PK-K-2
 Mechanics Grove School - 3-5
 Carl Sandburg Middle School - 6-8

Diamond Lake School District 76:
 Fairhaven School - PK-K-1
 Diamond Lake School - 2-4
 West Oak Middle School - 5-8

Fremont School District 79:
 Fremont Elementary School - K-2
 Fremont Intermediate School - 3-5
 Fremont Middle School - 6-8

Mundelein Consolidated High School District 120:
 Mundelein High School

Additionally, the following parochial schools are located in Mundelein:
 Santa Maria del Popolo School (Catholic) - K-8 (Closed in 2014)
 St. Mary of the Annunciation School (Catholic) - K-8 (Closed in 2019)
 Carmel High School (Catholic)

School District 75 boundaries changed significantly in 2003-2004, in response to studies indicating sharp disparities in ethnic makeup among various schools in the district. This rebalancing has placed some boundaries through the middle of some houses, and made drawing lines very difficult to describe.

Transportation
Mundelein has a station on Metra's North Central Service, which provides weekday rail service between Antioch and Chicago Union Station.

A small private airport, Air Estates Airport, is located northwest of Mundelein.

Newspapers
 Mundelein Review (Pioneer Press)
 Mundelein News
 Daily Herald (Arlington Heights)

Notable people 
 Al Salvi, former member of the Illinois House, US Senate candidate, managing partner of Salvi & Maher, LLC
 Sean McGrath, National Football League (NFL) tight end
 Ryan Borucki, Major League Baseball (MLB) pitcher

Notable landmarks and establishments 
 Diamond Lake (Illinois)

References

External links
 

 
1865 establishments in Illinois
Chicago metropolitan area
Populated places established in 1865
Villages in Illinois
Villages in Lake County, Illinois